Nnamdi Benjamin Azikiwe,   (16 November 1904 – 11 May 1996), usually referred to as "Zik", was a Nigerian statesman and political leader who served as the first President of Nigeria from 1963 to 1966. Considered a driving force behind the nation's independence, he came to be known as the "father of Nigerian Nationalism".

Born to Igbo parents from Anambra State, Eastern Nigeria in Zungeru in present-day Niger State, as a young boy he learned to speak Hausa (the main indigenous language of the Northern Region). Azikiwe was later sent to live with his aunt and grandmother in Onitsha (his parental homeland), where he learned the Igbo language. A stay in Lagos exposed him to the Yoruba language; by the time he was in college, he had been exposed to different Nigerian cultures and spoke three languages (an asset as president).

Azikiwe travelled to the United States where he was known as Ben Azikiwe and attended Storer College, Columbia University, the University of Pennsylvania and Howard University. He contacted colonial authorities with a request to represent Nigeria at the Los Angeles Olympics. He returned to Africa in 1934, where he began work as a journalist in the Gold Coast. In British West Africa, he advocated Nigerian and African nationalism as a journalist and a political leader.

Early life and education
Azikiwe was born on 16 November 1904 in Zungeru, Northern Nigeria. His first name means "my father is alive" in the Igbo language, as his parents were Igbo. His father, Obed-Edom Chukwuemeka Azikiwe(1879–3 March 1958), a native of Onye Onicha, was a clerk in the British Administration of Nigeria, who traveled extensively as part of his job. Azikiwe's mother was Rachel Chinwe Ogbenyeanu (Aghadiuno) Azikiwe (1883–January 1958), who was sometimes called Nwanonaku and was the third daughter of Aghadiuno Ajie. Her family descended from a royal family in Onitsha, and her paternal great-grandfather was Obi (Ugogwu) Anazenwu. Azikiwe had one sibling, a sister, named Cecilia Eziamaka Arinze.

As a young boy, Azikiwe spoke Hausa, the regional language. His father, concerned about his son's fluency in Hausa and not Igbo, sent him to Onitsha in 1912 to live with his paternal grandmother and aunt to learn the Igbo language and culture. In Onitsha, Azikiwe attended Holy Trinity School (a Roman Catholic mission school) and Christ Church School (an Anglican primary school). In 1914, while his father was working in Lagos, Azikiwe was bitten by a dog; this prompted his worried father to ask him to come to Lagos to heal and to attend school in the city. He then attended Wesleyan Boys' High School, now known as Methodist Boys’ High School, Broad Street Lagos. His father was sent to Kaduna two years later, and Azikiwe briefly lived with a relative who was married to a Muslim from Sierra Leone. In 1918, he was back in Onitsha and finished his secondary education at CMS Central School. Azikiwe then worked at the school as a student-teacher, supporting his mother with his earnings. In 1920, his father was posted back to southern Nigeria in the southeastern city of Calabar. Azikiwe joined his father in Calabar, beginning tertiary education  at the Hope Waddell Training College. He was introduced to the teachings of Marcus Garvey, Garveyism, which became an important part of his nationalistic rhetoric.

After attending Hope Waddell, Azikiwe was transferred to Methodist Boys' High School in Lagos and befriended classmates from old Lagos families such as George Shyngle, Francis Cole and Ade Williams (a son of the Akarigbo of Remo). These connections were later beneficial to his political career in Lagos. Azikiwe heard a lecture by James Aggrey, an educator who believed that Africans should receive a college education abroad and return to effect change. After the lecture, Aggrey gave the young Azikiwe a list of schools accepting black students in America. After completing his secondary education, Azikiwe applied to the colonial service and was accepted as a clerk in the' treasury department. His time in the colonial service exposed him to racial bias in the colonial government. Determined to travel abroad for further education, Azikiwe applied to universities in the U.S. He was admitted by Storer College, contingent on his finding a way to America. To reach America, he contacted a seaman and made a deal with him to become a stowaway. However, one of his friends on the ship became ill and they were advised to disembark in Sekondi. In Ghana, Azikiwe worked as a police officer; his mother visited, and asked him to return to Nigeria. He returned, and his father was willing to sponsor his trip to America.

Azikiwe attended Storer College's two-year preparatory school in Harpers Ferry, West Virginia. To fund his living expenses and tuition, he worked a number of menial jobs before enrolling in Howard University in Washington, D.C. in 1927 to obtain a bachelor's degree in political science. In 1929, he transferred from Howard University to Lincoln University to complete his undergraduate studies and graduated in 1930 with a BA in political science. Azikwe took courses with Alain Locke. Azikiwe was a member of Phi Beta Sigma. He then enrolled at Lincoln University in Pennsylvania and in the University of Pennsylvania simultaneously in 1930, receiving a master's degree in religion from Lincoln University and a master's degree in anthropology from the University of Pennsylvania in 1932. Azikiwe became a graduate-student instructor in the history and political-science departments at Lincoln University, where he created a course in African history. He was a candidate for a doctoral degree at Columbia University before returning to Nigeria in 1934. Azikiwe's doctoral research focused on Liberia in world politics, and his research paper was published by A. H. Stockwell in 1934. During his time in America, he was a columnist for the Baltimore Afro-American, Philadelphia Tribune and the Associated Negro Press. Azikiwe was influenced by the ideals of the African-American press, Garveyism and pan-Africanism.

Newspaper career

He applied as a foreign-service official for Liberia, but was rejected because he was not a native of the country. By 1934, when Azikiwe returned to Lagos, he was well-known and viewed as a public figure by some members of the Lagos and Igbo community. He was welcomed home by a number of people, as his writings in America evidently reached Nigeria. In Nigeria, Azikiwe's initial goal was to obtain a position commensurate with his education; after several unsuccessful applications (including for a teaching post at King's College), he accepted an offer from Ghanaian businessman Alfred Ocansey to become founding editor of the African Morning Post (a new daily newspaper in Accra, Ghana). He was given a free hand to run the newspaper, and recruited many of its original staff. Azikiwe wrote "The Inside Stuff by Zik", a column in which he preached radical nationalism and black pride which raised some alarm in colonial circles. As editor, he promoted a pro-African nationalist agenda. Yuri Smertin described his writing there: "In his passionately denunciatory articles and public statements he censured the existing colonial order: the restrictions on the African's right to express their opinions, and racial discrimination. He also criticized those Africans who belonged to the 'elite' of colonial society and. favoured retaining the existing order, as they regarded it as the basis of their well-being." During Azikiwe's stay in Accra he advanced his New Africa philosophy later explored in his book, Renascent Africa. The philosophic ideal is a state where Africans would be divorced from ethnic affiliations and traditional authorities and transformed by five philosophical pillars: spiritual balance, social regeneration, economic determinism, mental emancipation and risorgimento nationalism. Azikiwe did not shy away from Gold Coast politics, and the paper supported the local Mambii party.

The Post published a 15 May 1936 article, "Has the African a God?" by I. T. A. Wallace-Johnson, and Azikiwe (as editor) was tried for sedition. He was originally found guilty and sentenced to six months in prison, but his conviction was overturned on appeal. Azikiwe returned to Lagos in 1937 and founded the West African Pilot, a newspaper which he used to promote nationalism in Nigeria. In addition to the Pilot, his Zik Group established newspapers in politically- and economically important cities throughout the country. The group's flagship newspaper was the West African Pilot, which used Dante Alighieri's "Show the light and the people will find the way" as its motto. Other publications were the Southern Nigeria Defender from Warri (later Ibadan), the Eastern Guardian (founded in 1940 and published in Port Harcourt), and the Nigerian Spokesman in Onitsha. In 1944, the group acquired Dusé Mohamed Ali's The Comet. Azikiwe's newspaper venture was a business and political tool. The Pilot focused less on advertising than on circulation, largely because expatriate firms dominated the Nigerian economy. Many of Azikiwe's newspapers emphasized sensationalism and human-interest stories; the Pilot introduced sports coverage and a women's section, increasing coverage of Nigerian events compared with the competing Daily Times (which emphasized expatriate and foreign-news-service stories). The Pilot initial run was 6,000 copies daily; at its peak in 1950, it was printing over 20,000 copies. Azikiwe founded other business ventures (such as the African Continental Bank and the Penny Restaurant) at this time, and used his newspapers to advertise them.

Before World War II, the West African Pilot  was seen as a paper trying to build a circulation base rather than overtly radical. The paper's editorials and political coverage focused on injustice to Africans, criticism of the colonial administration and support for the ideas of the educated elites in Lagos. However, by 1940 a gradual change occurred. As he did in the African Morning Post, Azikiwe began writing a column ("Inside Stuff") in which he sometimes tried to raise political consciousness. Pilot editorials called for African independence, particularly after the rise of the Indian independence movement. Although the paper supported Great Britain during the war, it criticized austerity measures such as price controls and wage ceilings. In 1943 the British Council sponsored eight West African editors (including Azikiwe), and he and six other editors used the opportunity to raise awareness of possible political independence. The journalists signed a memorandum calling for gradual socio-political reforms, including abrogation of the crown colony system, regional representation and independence for British West African colonies by 1958 or 1960. The memorandum was ignored by the colonial office, increasing Azikiwe's militancy.

He had a controlling interest in over 12 daily, African-run newspapers. Azikiwe's articles on African nationalism, black pride and empowerment dismayed many colonialist politicians and benefited many marginalized Africans. East African newspapers generally published in Swahili, with the exception of newsletters such as the East African Standard. Azikiwe revolutionized the West African newspaper industry, demonstrating that English-language journalism could be successful. By 1950, the five leading African-run newspapers in the Eastern Region (including the Nigerian Daily Times) were outsold by the Pilot. On 8 July 1945, the Nigerian government banned Azikiwe's West African Pilot and Daily Comet for misrepresenting information about a general strike. Although Azikiwe acknowledged this, he continued publishing articles about the strike in the Guardian (his Port Harcourt newsletter). He led a 1945 general strike, and was the premier of East Nigeria from 1954 to 1959. By the 1960s, after Nigerian independence, the national West African Pilot was particularly influential in the east. Azikiwe took particular aim at political groups which advocated exclusion. He was criticized by a Yoruba faction for using his newspaper to suppress opposition to his views. At Azikiwe's death, The New York Times said that he "towered over the affairs of Africa's most populous nation, attaining the rare status of a truly national hero who came to be admired across the regional and ethnic lines dividing his country."

Political career
Azikiwe became active in the Nigerian Youth Movement (NYM), the country's first nationalist organization. Although he supported Samuel Akisanya as the NYM candidate for a vacant seat in the Legislative Council in 1941, the NYM executive council selected Ernest Ikoli.

Azikiwe resigned from the NYM, accusing the majority Yoruba leadership of discriminating against the Ijebu-Yoruba members and Igbos. Some Ijebu members followed him, splitting the movement along ethnic lines. He entered politics, co-founding the National Council of Nigeria and the Cameroons (NCNC) with Herbert Macaulay in 1944. Azikiwe became the council's secretary-general in 1946.

Conspiracy allegations and Zikist movement
As a result of Azikiwe's support for a general strike in June 1945 and his attacks on the colonial government, publication of the West African Pilot was suspended on 8 July of that year. He praised the striking workers and their leader, Michael Imoudu, accusing the colonial government of exploiting the working class. In August, the newspaper was allowed to resume publication. During the strike, Azikiwe raised the alarm about an assassination plot by unknown individuals working on behalf of the colonial government. His basis for the allegation was a wireless message intercepted by a Pilot reporter. After receiving the intercepted message, Azikiwe went into hiding in Onitsha. The Pilot published sympathetic editorials during his absence, and many Nigerians believed the assassination story. Azikiwe's popularity, and his newspaper circulation, increased during this period. The allegations were doubted by some Nigerians, who believed that he made them up to raise his profile. The skeptics were primarily Yoruba politicians from the Nigerian Youth Movement, creating a rift between the factions and a press war between Azikiwe's Pilot and the NYM's Daily Service.

A militant youth movement, led by Osita Agwuna, Raji Abdalla, Kolawole Balogun, M. C. K. Ajuluchukwu and Abiodun Aloba, was established in 1946 to defend Azikiwe's life and his ideals of self-government. Inspired by his writings and Nwafor Orizu's Zikism philosophy, members of the movement soon began advocating positive, militant action to bring about self-government. Calls for action included strikes, study of military science by Nigerian students overseas, and a boycott of foreign products. Azikiwe did not publicly defend the movement, which was banned in 1951 after a failed attempt to kill a colonial secretary.

Opposition to Richards constitution
In 1945, British governor Arthur Richards presented proposals for a revision of the Clifford constitution of 1922. Included in the proposal was an increase in the number of nominated African members to the Legislative Council. However, the changes were opposed by nationalists such as Azikiwe. NCNC politicians opposed unilateral decisions made by Arthur Richards and a constitutional provision allowing only four elected African members; the rest would be nominated candidates. The nominated African candidates were loyal to the colonial government, and would not aggressively seek self-government. Another basis of opposition was little input for the advancement of Africans to senior civil-service positions. The NCNC prepared to argue its case to the new Labour government of Clement Attlee in Britain. A tour of the country was begun to raise awareness of the party's concerns and to raise money for the UK protest. NCNC president Herbert Macaulay died during the tour, and Azikiwe assumed leadership of the party. He led the delegation to London and, in preparation for the trip, traveled to the US to seek sympathy for the party's case. Azikiwe met Eleanor Roosevelt at Hyde Park, and spoke about the "emancipation of Nigeria from political thralldom, economic insecurity and social disabilities". The UK delegation included Azikiwe, Funmilayo Ransome-Kuti, Zanna Dipcharima, Abubakar Olorunimbe, P. M. Kale, Adeleke Adedoyin and Nyong Essien. They visited the Fabian Society's Colonial Bureau, the Labor Imperial Committee and the West African Students' Union to raise awareness of its proposals for amendments to the 1922 constitution. Included in the NCNC proposals was consultation with Africans about changes to the Nigerian constitution, more power to the regional House of Assemblies and limiting the powers of the central Legislative Council to defense, currency and foreign affairs. The delegation submitted its proposals to the colonial secretary, but little was done to change to Richards' proposals. The Richards constitution took effect in 1947, and Azikiwe contested one of the Lagos seats to delay its implementation.

1950–1953
Under the Richards constitution, Azikiwe was elected to the Legislative Council in a Lagos municipal election from the National Democratic Party (an NCNC subsidiary). He and the party representative did not attend the first session of the council, and agitation for changes to the Richards constitution led to the Macpherson constitution. The Macpherson constitution took effect in 1951 and, like the Richards constitution, called for elections to the regional House of Assembly. Azikiwe opposed the changes, and contested for the chance to change the new constitution. Staggered elections were held from August to December 1951. In the Western Region (where Azikiwe stood), two parties were dominant: Azikiwe's NCNC and the Action Group. Elections for the Western Regional Assembly were held in September and December 1951 because the constitution allowed an electoral college to choose members of the national legislature; an Action Group majority in the house might prevent Azikiwe from going to the House of Representatives. He won a regional assembly seat from Lagos, but the opposition party claimed a majority in the House of Assembly and Azikiwe did not represent Lagos in the federal House of Representatives. In 1951, he became leader of the Opposition to the government of Obafemi Awolowo in the Western Region's House of Assembly. Azikiwe's non-selection to the national assembly caused chaos in the west. An agreement by elected NCNC members from Lagos to step down for Azikiwe if he was not nominated broke down. Azikiwe blamed the constitution, and wanted changes made. The NCNC (which dominated the Eastern Region) agreed, and committed to amending the constitution.

Azikiwe moved to the Eastern Region in 1952, and the NCNC-dominated regional assembly made proposals to accommodate him. Although the party's regional and central ministers were asked to resign in a cabinet reshuffle, most ignored the request. The regional assembly then passed a vote of no confidence on the ministers, and appropriation bills sent to the ministry were rejected. This created an impasse in the region, and the lieutenant governor dissolved the regional house. A new election returned Azikiwe as a member of the Eastern Assembly. He was selected as Chief Minister, and became premier of Nigeria's Eastern Region in 1954 when it became a federating unit.

Presidency and later life

Azikiwe became governor-general on 16 November 1960, with Abubakar Tafawa Balewa as prime minister, and became the first Nigerian named to the Privy Council of the United Kingdom. When Nigeria became a republic in 1963, he was its first president. In both posts, Azikiwe's role was largely ceremonial.

He and his civilian colleagues were removed from office in the 15 January 1966 military coup, and he was the most prominent politician to avoid assassination after the coup. Azikiwe was a spokesman for Biafra and advised its leader, Chukwuemeka Odumegwu Ojukwu, during the Biafran War (1967–1970). He switched his allegiance back to Nigeria during the war, and appealed to Ojukwu to end the war in pamphlets and interviews. The New York Times said about his politics, "Throughout his life, Dr. Azikiwe's alliance with northerners put him at odds with Obafemi Awolowo, a socialist-inclined leader of the Yoruba, the country's other important southern group."

After the war, Azikiwe was chancellor of the University of Lagos from 1972 to 1976. He joined the Nigerian People's Party in 1978, making unsuccessful bids for the presidency in 1979 and 1983. He left politics involuntarily after the 31 December 1983 military coup.

Azikiwe died aged 91 on 11 May 1996 at the University of Nigeria Teaching Hospital in Enugu after a long illness, and is buried in his native Onitsha.

Honours
Places named after Azikiwe include:
Azikiwe-Nkrumah Hall, the oldest building on the Lincoln University campus
Nnamdi Azikwe Hall, University of Ibadan
Nnamdi Azikiwe International Airport in Abuja 
Nnamdi Azikiwe Stadium in Enugu
Nnamdi Azikiwe University in Awka, Anambra State
Nnamdi Azikiwe University Teaching Hospital in Nnewi
Nnamdi Azikiwe Library at the University of Nigeria, Nsukka
Nnamdi Azikiwe Press Centre, Dodan Barracks, Obalende, Ikoyi, Lagos
Azikiwe Avenue in Dar es Salaam, Tanzania
CRDB Azikiwe Branch in Dar es Salaam

His picture appears on Nigeria's ₦500 banknote since 2001.

Achievements
Azikiwe was inducted into the Agbalanze society of Onitsha as Nnanyelugo in 1946, a recognition for Onitsha men with significant accomplishments. In 1962, he became a second-rank red cap chieftain (Ndichie Okwa) as the Oziziani Obi. Chief Azikiwe was installed as the Owelle-Osowa-Anya of Onitsha in 1972, making him a first-rank hereditary red cap nobleman (Ndichie Ume) in the Igbo branch of the Nigerian chieftaincy system.

He established the University of Nigeria, Nsukka in 1960, and Queen Elizabeth II appointed him to the Privy Council of the United Kingdom. He was made Grand Commander of the Federal Republic (GCFR), Nigeria's highest national honour, in 1980.

Sports
Azikiwe competed in boxing, athletics, swimming, football and tennis.

Football was brought to Nigeria by the British as they colonized Africa. However, any leagues that were formed were segregated. Nnamdi saw this as an injustice and he emerged as a leader in terms of connection sports and politics at the end of the colonial period. In 1934 Zik was denied the right to compete in a track and field event because Nigeria was not allowed to participate. This happened another time because of his Igbo background, and Zik had decided that enough was enough, and wanted to create his own club. Nnamdi founded Zik's Athletic Club (ZAC) which would open its doors to sportsmen and women of all races, nationalities, tribes, and classes of Nigeria. In 1942 the club went on to win both the Lagos League and the War Memorial Cup. After these victories, Nnamdi opened up more ZAC branches throughout Nigeria. During the war years ZAC would go on tours. They would usually play a match in front of a couple thousand fans and after the match, they would speak out about the injustices that was brought about by the British colonization. ZAC matches would happen all over the country, and it made the people of Nigeria feel a sense of unity and nationalism that would help them fight for freedom. In 1949 some ZAC players participated in a tour of England. On the return from the tour they stopped in Freetown, Sierra Leone, and Nigeria defeated the locals by 2 goals. This victory was more than a decade before Nigerian independence, but it marked the birth of Nigeria's National Team. Finally, after years of struggle, in 1959 the last British official left the NFA, and on 22 August 1960, a few weeks prior to its formal independence, Nigeria joined the world football body of FIFA. None of this would have been possible if it was not for Nnamdi Azikiwe. He united Nigeria through sport and brought about a sense of nationalism that was referred to as ‘Nigerian-ness’.

Works

 Zik (1961)
 My Odyssey: An Autobiography (1971)
 Renascent Africa (1973)
 Liberia in World Politics (1931)
 One Hundred Quotable Quotes and Poems of the Rt. Hon. Dr. Nnamdi Azikiwe (1966). 
 Political Blueprint for Nigeria (1943)
Economic Reconstruction of Nigeria (1943)
Zik: A Selection of the Speeches of Dr. Nnamdi Azikiwe (1961)
Assassination Story: True or False? (1946)
Before Us Lies the Open Grave (1947)
The Future of Pan-Africanism (1961)
The Realities of African Unity (1965)
Origins of the Nigerian Civil War (1969)
I Believe in One Nigeria (1969)
Peace Proposals for Ending the Nigerian Civil War (1969)
Dialogue on a New Capital for Nigeria (1974)
Creation of More States in Nigeria, A Political Analysis (1974)
Democracy with Military Vigilance (1974)
Reorientation of Nigerian Ideologies: lecture on 9 December 1976, on the eve of the launching of the UNN Endowment Fund (1976)
Our Struggle for Freedom; Onitsha Market Crisis (1976)
Let Us Forgive Our Children. An appeal to the leaders and people of Onitsha during the market crisis (1976)
A Collection of Poems (1977)
Civil War Soliloquies: More Collection of Poems (1977)
Themes in African Social and Political Thought (1978)
Restoration of Nigerian Democracy (1978)
Matchless Past Performance: My Reply to Chief Awolowo's Challenge (1979)
A Matter of Conscience (1979)
Ideology for Nigeria: Capitalism, Socialism or Welfarism? (1980)
Breach of Trust by the NPN (1983)
History Will Vindicate The Just (1983)

See also

 African nationalism
 Zikist philosophy

References

Notes

Further reading

External links

Nnamdi Azikiwe: Respect for Human Dignity: an Inaugural Address at World Digital Library

 
1904 births
1996 deaths
Members of the Privy Council of the United Kingdom
Methodist Boys' High School alumni
Nigerian Christians
Igbo politicians
Presidents of Nigeria
Presidents of the Senate (Nigeria)
Leaders ousted by a coup
Lincoln University (Pennsylvania) alumni
Howard University alumni
University of Pennsylvania School of Arts and Sciences alumni
Governors and Governors-General of Nigeria
Nnamdi
Nigerian People's Party politicians
National Council of Nigeria and the Cameroons politicians
Nigerian newspaper chain founders
Storer College alumni
20th-century Nigerian politicians
Grand Commanders of the Order of the Federal Republic
Nigerian nationalists
University of Lagos people
People from Niger State
Burials in Anambra State
Nigerian revolutionaries
Candidates in the 1979 Nigerian presidential election
Members of the Legislative Council of Nigeria
Founders of Nigerian schools and colleges
University of Nigeria people
University and college founders
Premiers of Eastern Nigeria
Hope Waddell Institute alumni